Craig Alderdice (born 2 August 1961) is a former Australian rules footballer who played with Geelong in the Victorian Football League (VFL).

Alderdice played 25 senior games for Geelong, 12 of them in the 1985 VFL season. He was out with injury in 1986, then after surgery returned to play twice in 1987 and make 11 appearances in 1988. At the end of the 1989 season, Alderdice was cut from Geelong's list.

References

1961 births
Australian rules footballers from Victoria (Australia)
Geelong Football Club players
Living people